Kudakwashe Macheka (born 25 September 2000) is a Zimbabwean cricketer. He made his first-class debut on 27 December 2019, for Rangers in the 2019–20 Logan Cup. He made his List A debut on 5 February 2020, for Rangers in the 2019–20 Pro50 Championship. In December 2020, he was selected to play for the Rhinos in the 2020–21 Logan Cup.

References

External links
 

2000 births
Living people
Zimbabwean cricketers
Rangers cricketers
Place of birth missing (living people)